This list of fossil fishes described in 2017 is a list of new taxa of jawless vertebrates, placoderms, acanthodians, fossil cartilaginous fishes, bony fishes and other fishes of every kind that are scheduled to be described during the year 2017, as well as other significant discoveries and events related to paleontology of fishes that are scheduled to occur in the year 2017. The list only includes taxa at the level of genus or species.

Research
 A study on the marine fish extinction rates during background and mass extinctions from the Permian through Early Jurassic, compared with extinction trajectories of marine invertebrates, is published by Vázquez & Clapham (2017).
 A study on the ecological diversity and lifestyles of thelodonts as indicated by their squamation patterns is published by Ferrón & Botella (2017).
 A study on the phylogenetic relationships of jawless fish assigned to Cyathaspididae and Pteraspidiformes is published by Randle & Sansom (2017).
 A study on the phylogenetic relationships of members of the group Pteraspidiformes is published by Randle & Sansom (2017).
 New material of Cornovichthys blaauweni and Achanarella trewini is described from the Devonian of Scotland by van der Brugghen (2017), who considers both species to represent the same euphaneropid taxon, which he considers to be a member of the genus Euphanerops belonging or related to the species Euphanerops longaevus.
 A study on the phylogenetic relationships of early jawed vertebrates, indicating that placoderms are a monophyletic group, is published by King et al. (2017).
 A study on the morphology of the gill arches of the type specimen of Paraplesiobatis heinrichsi is published by Brazeau et al. (2017).
 Description of the anatomy of a three-dimensionally preserved skull of the placoderm Romundina stellina is published by Dupret et al. (2017).
 A study on the putative dental plate of Romundina stellina described by Rücklin & Donoghue (2015) is published by Smith et al. (2017), who reject the interpretation of the specimen as a dental plate.
 A redescription of Bothriolepis jeremejevi Rohon (1900) from the Devonian (Famennian) Sosnogorsk Formation (Komi Republic, Russia) is published by Lukševičs, Beznosov & Stūris (2017), who rerank this taxon as a subspecies of Bothriolepis leptocheira.
 A study on the plates of armour of arthrodire placoderms from the Devonian (Emsian) of Morocco, evaluating whether their differences can be considered distinctive between species, is published by Antczak & Berkowski (2017).
 A description of a nearly complete specimen of Titanichthys from the Devonian Cleveland Shale and a study on the phylogenetic relationships of the taxon is published by Boyle & Ryan (2017).
 Redescription of the Devonian arthrodire species Szelepis yunnanensis, a revision of the fossil material attributed to members of this species and a study on the phylogenetic relationships of the species is published by Dupret, Zhu & Wang (2017).
 A study on the placoderm jaw morphology and function based on data from a buchanosteid specimen from the Early Devonian limestones (~400 Ma) at Burrinjuck, near Canberra (Australia), is published by Hu, Lu & Young (2017).
 A study on the relationship between the locomotory patterns and the morphological variability of the tail fins in extant sharks, and its implications for the possible morphology of the tail fin of Dunkleosteus terrelli is published by Ferrón, Martínez-Pérez & Botella (2017).
 A study on the sequence of ossification of skeletal elements in the growth series of the acanthodian Acanthodes lopatini from the lower Tournaisian of Siberia (Russia) is published by Beznosov (2017).
 A study on the anatomy of the jaws of the Devonian ischnacanthiform acanthodian species Euryacanthus rugosus and Tricuspicanthus gannitus, as well as its implications for jaw and tooth occlusion in these taxa, is published by Blais (2017).
 A study on the morphological and histological changes of scales during ontogeny in the acanthodian Triazeugacanthus affinis is published by Chevrinais, Sire & Cloutier (2017).
 Chevrinais, Sire & Cloutier (2017) describe the ontogeny of Triazeugacanthus affinis and compare it to the ontogeny of other “acanthodians”, cartilaginous fishes and bony fishes.
 A study on the anatomy of the pectoral region of the skeleton of Doliodus problematicus is published by Maisey et al. (2017).
 A study on the phylogenetic relationships of the Devonian (Emsian) species "Ctenacanthus" latispinosus is published by Burrow et al. (2017), who transfer this species to the genus Doliodus.
 A study on the diversity and relative abundance of fish from the Late Cretaceous (late Santonian) Milk River Formation (Alberta, Canada) is published by Brinkman, Neuman & Divay (2017).
 A study on the phylogenetic relationships of Palaeospondylus gunni is published by Johanson et al. (2017), who interpret the species as a stem-cartilaginous fish.
 Partial braincases of two gigantic ctenacanthiform sharks, estimated to attain lengths up to 7 m and body weights of 1500–2500 kg, are described from the Carboniferous (Upper Pennsylvanian) Finis Shale (Texas, United States) by Maisey et al. (2017).
 A study on the anatomy of the braincase of a Permian cartilaginous fish Dwykaselachus oosthuizeni is published by Coates et al. (2017).
 Partial skeleton of a non-marine elasmobranch of uncertain phylogenetic placement is described from the Late Jurassic Talbragar Fossil Fish Bed (Australia) by Turner & Avery (2017).
 A hybodontiform tooth and a euselachian dermal denticle are described from the Permian (Wuchiapingian) of Hydra Island (Greece) by Argyriou et al. (2017).
 A reappraisal of the type and newly discovered fossil material of the hybodontoid Reticulodus synergus from Upper Triassic strata in Arizona, Utah and New Mexico (United States) and a study on the heterodonty in this species is published by Voris & Heckert (2017).
 A study on the impact of the Cretaceous–Paleogene extinction event on the ecological diversity of the mackerel sharks is published by Belben et al. (2017).
 A study on the environment in the area corresponding to the present-day Amazon basin in the Miocene as indicated by data from the shark and ray fossils from the Pirabas Formation (Brazil) is published by Aguilera et al. (2017).
 Evidence for the existence of regional endothermy in otodontid and cretoxyrhinid sharks is presented by Ferrón (2017).
 Bite marks on fossil marine mammal bones from the Miocene Pisco Formation (Peru), attributed to Carcharocles megalodon, are described by Collareta et al. (2017).
 Shark assemblage consisting mainly of the teeth of small (probably juvenile) specimens of the copper shark (Carcharhinus brachyurus), interpreted as a secondary nursery area for copper sharks, is described from the Miocene Pisco Formation (Peru) by Landini et al. (2017).
 A study on the methods which can be used to support taxonomic identifications of fossil sharks known from isolated teeth is published by Marramà & Kriwet (2017), who consider fossil sand tiger shark genus Brachycarcharias to be distinct from the genus Lamna. 
 A study on the morphology of the cushion-shaped tooth-bearing plates from the Silurian of Estonia attributed to Lophosteus superbus, as well as on tooth addition, shedding and replacement in this taxon, is published by Chen et al. (2017).
 Redescription of the Permian ray-finned fish Elonichthys fritschi is published by Schindler (2017), who presents the first reconstruction of the skull of this species.
 Fish belonging to the extinct group Scanilepiformes are interpreted as stem-polypterids by Giles et al. (2017).
 A study aiming to establish whether body size was linked to extinction or survival of non-teleostean actinopterygians during the Permian–Triassic extinction event is published by Puttick et al. (2017).
 Description of fish fossils from the Cretaceous (Santonian) Iharkút vertebrate site (Bakony Mountains, Hungary) is published by Szabó & Ősi (2017).
 A redescription of Kyphosichthys grandei and a study on the phylogenetic relationships of the species is published by Sun & Ni (2017), who name the new family Kyphosichthyidae.
 A study on the phylogenetic relationships of the Late Cretaceous species Sorbinicharax verraesi is published by Mayrinck et al. (2017).
 Taverne & Liston (2017) transfer the species Neopachycormus birmanicus from the Cretaceous of Myanmar, originally thought to be a member of the family Pachycormidae, to the family Plethodidae and to the genus Dixonanogmius.
 A study on the osteology and phylogenetic relationships of Signeuxella preumonti from the Middle Jurassic Stanleyville Formation (Democratic Republic of the Congo) is published by Taverne (2017).
 The leptolepid fauna from the Early Jurassic Lagerstätten of Grimmen and Dobbertin (Mecklenburg-Vorpommern, Germany) is described by Konwert & Stumpf (2017).
 A redescription of the Early Cretaceous ellimmichthyiform Scutatuspinosus itapagipensis and a study on the phylogenetic relationships of the species is published by de Figueiredo & Ribeiro (2017).
 Redescription and a study on the phylogenetic relationships of the clupeomorph species Gasteroclupea branisai from the Late Cretaceous-Paleocene of El Molino Formation (Bolivia) is published by Marramà & Carnevale (2017).
 A redescription of "Chanos" leopoldi from the Cretaceous (Albian) Limestones of Pietraroja (Italy) and a study on the phylogenetic relationships of the species is published by Taverne & Capasso (2017), who reinstate the distinct genus Caeus for this species.
 A study on the phylogenetic relationships of living and fossil members of the family Ictaluridae, and on time of origin of the clade, is published by Arce‐H., Lundberg & O'Leary (2017), who present the first combined data analysis of morphological and genetic data for Ictaluridae that also includes fossil species.
 Cyprinid fossils are described from the Miocene (Serravallian) Shang Youshashan Formation (Qaidam Basin, China) by Song et al. (2017).
 A redescription of the Eocene barracudina Holosteus esocinus and a study on the phylogenetic relationships of the species is published by Marramà & Carnevale (2017).
 A redescription of the holotype specimen of Bajaichthys elegans and a study on the phylogenetic relationships of the species is published by Davesne, Carnevale & Friedman (2017).
 A study on the phylogenetic relationships of the fossil fundulid species Fundulus detillae, Fundulus lariversi and Fundulus nevadensis is published by Ghedotti & Davis (2017).
 A study on the phylogeny and evolutionary history of the Tetraodontiformes is published by Arcila & Tyler (2017), who detect a major extinction of members of the group during the Paleocene–Eocene Thermal Maximum.
 A study on the morphological changes that occurred during ontogeny of the fossil weever species Trachinus minutus is published by Přikryl (2017).
 Cichlid fossils are described from the Miocene and Pleistocene of Costa Rica by Lucas et al. (2017), representing the first known fossil record of cichlids in Central America.
 Redescription of the Eocene priacanthid species Pristigenys substriata is published by Carnevale et al. (2017).
 Isolated barracuda teeth are described from the Miocene of Madagascar by Gottfried et al. (2017).
 A study on the structure and homology of the lung plates of extant and fossil coelacanths is published by Cupello et al. (2017).
 The first direct evidence for feeding on conodonts by Late Devonian coelacanths (a single conodont element from the gut content of a possible specimen of Diplocercides, as well as several conodont elements detected within a coprolite) is reported from the Famennian deposits in Świętokrzyskie Mountains (Poland) by Zatoń et al. (2017).
 A study on the phylogenetic relationships, rates of origination and extinction, and trends in body size changes of the post-Devonian fossil lungfish is published by Kemp, Cavin & Guinot (2017).
 A study on the phylogenetic relationships of the Early Cretaceous lungfish known from the tooth plates recovered from the Ain el Guettar Formation (Tunisia) is published by Cau (2017).
 A redescription of the Devonian lungfish Pentlandia macroptera is published by Challands and den Blaauwen (2017).
 A study on the evolution of eye size in early tetrapods and in fish belonging to the lineage that gave rise to tetrapods, as well as on the impact of the eye size on the eye performance while viewing objects through water and through air is published by MacIver et al. (2017).
 A study on the evolution of forelimb musculature from the lobe-finned fish to early tetrapods is published online by Molnar et al. (2017).
 A history of the first articulated fossil fishes discovered in the United States (Early Jurassic, Newark Supergroup) is published by Brignon (2017).

New taxa

Jawless vertebrates

Placoderms

Cartilaginous fishes

Bony fishes

References

2017 in paleontology
2010s in paleontology
2017 in science